is a railway station in Soo, Kagoshima, Japan.

Lines

Layout 
The station consists of two side platforms serving two tracks on a low embankment. The station building is a simple functional shed which is unstaffed and serves only to house a waiting area. From there, a short flight of steps leads up the embankment to the first platform. Access to the opposite side platform is by means of a footbridge.

Platforms

JR

Adjacent stations

History
On the same day Kitamata was opened as an intermediate station on the new track. The station and the Kokuto East Line were then absorbed and were designated as part of the Nippō Main Line on 6 December 1932. With the privatization of Japanese National Railways (JNR), the successor of JGR, on 1 April 1987, the station came under the control of JR Kyushu.

See also
List of railway stations in Japan

References

External links 

Kitamata (JR Kyushu)

Railway stations in Japan opened in 1931
Railway stations in Kagoshima Prefecture